Forelius rufus is a species of ant in the genus Forelius. Described by Gallardo in 1916, the species is endemic to Argentina and Bolivia.

References

Dolichoderinae
Hymenoptera of South America
Insects described in 1916